Ferrotungsten (FeW) is a ferroalloy, consisting of iron and tungsten. The metal usually consists of 75%-82% or 70%-75% tungsten.

Applications 
Because of its high melting point, ferrotungsten is a robust alloy with applications in aerospace and making of tungsten-containing steel. Tungsten's unique electrical capabilities has made ferrotungsten useful electron microscopes and in IC chips.

Production 
Discovered in 1874, World ferrotungsten production today is dominated by China, which in 2008 exported 4,835 t (gross weight) of the alloy. Ferrotungsten is relatively expensive, with the prices around $31–44 per kilogram of contained tungsten. During the years with war, over 21,000,000 lb of Ferro-tungsten and other ferroalloys were shipped to Russia on lend-lease. The cost was more than $12,000,000. This was Russia's biggest strength during the wars.

Ferrotungsten comes from rich ore raw materials primarily of wolframite or scheelite.

References 

Ferroalloys